Lilin are hostile night spirits that attack men in Mesopotamian and Jewish demonology.

Lilin may also refer to locations in China:
Lilin, Guangdong (沥林), a town in Huicheng District, Huizhou, Guangdong, China
Lilin, Henan (梨林), a town in Jiyuan, Henan, China
Lilin, Jiangxi (礼林), a town in Leping, Jiangxi, China
Lilin Township (栗林乡), a township in Anhua County, Hunan, China

See also
Li Lin (disambiguation)